Trachitol is a brand of lozenge used as an over-the-counter drug for having a sore throat. It is being produced by Engelhard Arzneimittel GmbH&Co and distributed by Salveo Pharma bv. Trachitol packages are available with 20 or 30 lozenges.

Every lozenge contains the following substances: 
1 mg Lidocaine for local anesthesia.
1 mg potassium alum for astringent.
1,8 mg propylparaben for desinfection.

References

Throat lozenges